The 2017 Continental Tire SportsCar Championship is the eighteenth season of the Continental Tire SportsCar Challenge and the fourth season organized by the International Motor Sports Association (IMSA).

Classes
The class structure remains unchanged from 2016. However, cars homologated to the FIA-certified Group GT4 regulations are eligible to race in the GS category alongside original GS cars.

Schedule
The schedule remains unchanged, aside from the dates at Circuit of the Americas and Mazda Raceway Laguna Seca switching. Additionally, there are a pair of four-hour endurance races at Daytona International Speedway and Laguna Seca. All other races are approximately two hours in length.

Entry list

Grand Sport

Street Tuner

Race results
Bold indicates overall winner.

References

External links

2017
2017 in American motorsport